Graciela Castillo (born 1940) is an Argentine electroacoustic composer. She was born in Córdoba, Argentina. In the mid-1960s, she was among a group of composers that created the Experimental Music Center (Centro de Música Experimental) at the National University of Córdoba. She composed music at the center, and later took a position as Professor of Composition and Music Analysis at the National University.

Works
Selected works include:
Concreción 65, concrete music on tape, 1965
Y así era, for tape, 1982
Diálogos for two voices, typewriters, radios, and percussion
Homenaje a Eliot, open work for voices, concrète sounds and music theatre actions, both in 1965
Colores y masas, concrète music for paintings by José De Monte, in 1966
Estudio sobre mi voz for tape, 1967
Estudio sobre mi voz II for tape, 1967
Tres estudios concretos, for tape, 1967
El Pozo, original version for voices, two wind instruments, typewriters and percussion, 1968 (the score was published in John Cage's book Notations), second version for instruments and tape, around 1969
Memorias, a series of three electroacoustic pieces for tape ("La casa grande", "Memorias" and "memorias II"), 1991
Tierra for tape in 1994
Iris en los espejos for tape, 1996
Iris en los espejos II for piano, keyboards and processed sounds, 1996
De objetos y desvíos for tape, 1998–99
Los 40 pianos de San Francisco for prepared piano and processed sounds in 1999
Alma mía for tape in 2000
Ofrenda for flute and processed sounds, 2001
Ofrenda II for flute and processed sounds, 2001 
Retorno al fuego, for tape, 2002
La vuelta (Tango), for tape, 2002

References

1940 births
Living people
20th-century classical composers
Argentine music educators
Argentine women educators
Women classical composers
Argentine classical composers
Women music educators
20th-century women composers
Argentine women composers